Ganado High School may refer to two high schools in the United States:

Ganado High School (Arizona): Ganado, Arizona
Ganado High School (Texas): Ganado, Texas